Cherepovets Airport  is an international airport in Botovo village, Cherepovetsky District, Vologda Oblast, Russia, located  north of Cherepovets.

The airport has the head office of Severstal Air Company.

Airlines and destinations

References

External links

Airports built in the Soviet Union
Airports in Vologda Oblast